In the electronics industry, a second source is a company that is licensed to manufacture and sell components originally designed by another company (the first source).

It is common for engineers and purchasers to avoid components that are only available from a single source, to avoid the risk that a problem with the supplier would prevent a popular and profitable product from being manufactured. For simple components such as resistors and transistors, this is not usually an issue, but for complex integrated circuits, vendors often react by licensing one or more other companies to manufacture and sell the same parts as second sources. While the details of such licenses are usually confidential, they often involve cross-licensing, so that each company also obtains the right to manufacture and sell parts designed by the other.

Examples

MOS Technology licensed Rockwell and Synertek to second-source the 6502 microprocessor and its support components.

Intel licensed AMD to second-source Intel microprocessors such as the 8086 and its related support components. This second-source agreement is particularly famous for leading to much  litigation between the two parties. The agreement gave AMD the rights to second-source later Intel parts, but Intel refused to provide the masks for the 386 to AMD. AMD reverse-engineered the 386, and Intel then claimed that AMD's license to the 386 microcode only allowed AMD to "use" the microcode but not to sell products incorporating it. The courts eventually decided in favor of AMD.

References

Electronics manufacturing